Lieutenant General The Right Honourable Sir Thomas Maitland  (10 March 1760 – 17 January 1824) was a British soldier and British colonial governor. He also served as a Member of Parliament for Haddington from 1790 to 1796, 1802–06 and 1812–13. He was made a Privy Councillor on 23 November 1803. He was the second surviving son of James Maitland, 7th Earl of Lauderdale, and the younger brother of James Maitland, 8th Earl of Lauderdale. Maitland never married.

Early military career

Maitland was commissioned into the Edinburgh Light Horse, shortly after his birth, but did not take up his commission until he joined the 78th (Highland) Regiment of Foot (Seaforth Highland Regiment) as a captain in 1778. He transferred to the 62nd Foot as a major in 1790. He was promoted lieutenant-colonel in 1794 and colonel and brigadier-general in 1798.

Haitian Revolution

In 1797, Maitland landed in Saint-Domingue, under orders to capture the French colony. Maitland realised that his forces were quickly dying in droves due to yellow fever, and he began to negotiate a retreat with the Haitian leader, Toussaint Louverture. Henry Dundas, 1st Viscount Melville, who was the Secretary of State for War for prime minister William Pitt the Younger, had instructed Sir Adam Williamson, the lieutenant-governor of Jamaica, to sign an agreement with representatives of the French colonists that promised to restore the ancien regime, slavery and discrimination against mixed-race colonists, a move that drew criticism from abolitionists William Wilberforce and Thomas Clarkson.

Elkins and McKitrick write:

It was in fact Maitland and not the War Ministry who had determined that Britain's only sensible choice, rather than try to maintain any kind of presence at Jérémie and Môle-Saint-Nicolas, was to deal directly with Louverture and negotiate a total evacuation of the island. Accordingly he and the black general concluded a secret agreement on August 31, 1798. Great Britain would desist from any further attack on St. Domingue and any interference with its internal affairs; Louverture made a similar promise with regard to Jamaica; and Maitland would see that provisions were allowed to reach the ports of St. Domingue without interference from British cruisers.

In May 1799, Maitland returned to Saint-Domingue to negotiate an extension of the agreement with Louverture.  On 13 June, in the presence of Edward Stevens, the representative of the United States on the island, Maitland and Louverture signed the Maitland Convention, which stipulated that the ports of Le Cap and Port-Républicain would be opened to Anglo-American shipping.

Governor of Ceylon

Maitland served as Governor of Ceylon (Sri Lanka) during 1805 to 1811.
While at Ceylon, Maitland was attracted to a place at "Galkissa" (Mount Lavinia) and decided to construct his palace there.
During this time, Maitland fell in love with a half-caste dancing-girl named Lovina, who had been born to Portuguese and Sinhalese parents. During the construction of the palace, Maitland gave instructions for the construction of a secret tunnel to Lovina's house, which was located close to the governor's palace. One end of the tunnel was inside the well of Lovina's house and the other end was in a wine cellar inside the governor's palace. When the governor came to reside there, he would often use the tunnel to meet Lovina. The Sinhalese village that surrounded the Governor's mansion developed into a modern city named "Galkissa". Later the city was renamed "Mount Lavinia" in honour of Lovina. In 1920 the tunnel was sealed up. The bicentenary celebration of the Mount Lavinia Hotel was held in 2005. Some of Sir Thomas Maitland's relatives living in the UK attended the ceremony. Two roads in central Colombo in modern-day Sri Lanka, are named for him, Maitland Crescent and Maitland Place.

Peninsular War
In early 1812, The 1st Earl of Wellington began the campaign that resulted in his victory at the Battle of Salamanca on 22 July. To prevent Marshal
Louis Gabriel Suchet from sending French reinforcements from the east coast of Spain, Wellington requested that Lord William Bentinck launch a diversionary operation using the British garrison of Sicily. At first Bentinck agreed to send 10,000 of his soldiers, but in March he reversed himself. After much persuasion, he allowed the operation to go forward and on 7 June he put 8,000 men aboard naval transports under the command of Maitland. The fickle Bentinck changed his mind again on 9 June, stopping the expedition. At last on 28 June Maitland sailed for Menorca. He wisely decided that Barcelona was too strong to attack, but he also refused to try to capture weakly held Tarragona. Maitland soon received news that Joseph O'Donnell's Army of Murcia had been routed at the Battle of Castalla on 21 July. Without the support of O'Donnell, Maitland decided he could not accomplish anything. He re-embarked his expeditionary force and sailed to Alicante instead, joining his troops with the garrison to form an army of 15,000 men. With the disaster at Salamanca, the French were forced to evacuate both Madrid in central Spain and Andalusia in the south. Their combined forces joined Suchet in the province of Valencia. In close proximity to 80,000 French soldiers, Maitland declined to move from Alicante. Maitland asked to be relieved in September 1812 due to illness.

Governor of Malta and of the Ionian Islands 

Maitland became Lieutenant-Governor of Portsmouth and General Officer Commanding South-West District in May 1813 and was then appointed as Governor of Malta on 23 July, when the island became a crown colony instead of a protectorate. The plague had broken out in Malta in March 1813 and the disease began to spread especially in Valletta and the Grand Harbour area. Maitland arrived on the island on 3 October 1813 and took his oath of office on 5 October. Once in post, he enforced stricter quarantine measures. The plague spread to Gozo by the following January, but the islands were free of the disease by March 1814. Overall, 4486 people were killed which amounted to 4% of the total population. It is thought that the outbreak would have been worse without Maitland's strict actions.

After the eradication of the plague, Maitland made several reforms. He removed British troops from Lampedusa on 25 September 1814, ending the dispute that had started in 1800. On Malta, he was autocratic and he refused to form an advisory council made up of Maltese representatives, and so he was informally known as "King Tom". He formed the Malta Police Force in 1814, while the local Italian-speaking Università was dissolved in 1819. Various reforms were undertaken in taxation and the law courts as well. Maitland remained Governor until his death from apoplexy on 17 January 1824. He was attended on his death-bed by doctors Robert Grieves, Alexander Broadfoot and John Hennen.

While he was Governor of Malta, Maitland also served as Lord High Commissioner of the Ionian Islands during 1815 to 1823, while the islands were a British protectorate. The seat of administration was at Corfu, where he was represented by Sir Frederick Hankey, his private secretary. The neoclassical Maitland Monument was built there in his honour in 1821.

Citations

See also
Mount Lavinia Hotel
Maitland Plan
Law enforcement in Malta

References

 Aves, Edward (2003) Sri Lanka. Bath, England: Footprint. .
 Elkins, Stanley M. and Eric McKitrick (1993) The Age of Federalism. New York: Oxford University Press. .
 
 
 James, C.L.R. (2001) The Black Jacobins: Toussaint L'Ouverture and the San Domingo Revolution. London: Penguin Books. .
 Seneviratne, Maureen (1995) The story of Mount Lavinia Hotel. Colombo, Sri Lanka: McCallum Publishers. .

Further reading
 Dixon, Cyril Willis (1939) The Colonial Administrations of Sir Thomas Maitland Longmans, Green and Company, London, ; reprinted in 1968 by Cass, London, 
 Hulugalle, H. A. J. (1963) "Sir Thomas Maitland (1805–1811)" British Governors of Ceylon Associated Newspapers of Ceylon, Colombo, Sri Lanka, pages 18–25,

External links

 The Louverture Project: Thomas Maitland – Thomas Maitland and the Haitian Revolution.

|-

|-

|-

|-

1760 births
1824 deaths
Younger sons of earls
British Army generals
72nd Highlanders officers
Royal Lincolnshire Regiment officers
Wiltshire Regiment officers
West India Regiment officers
Members of the Parliament of Great Britain for Scottish constituencies
British MPs 1790–1796
Members of the Parliament of the United Kingdom for Scottish constituencies
UK MPs 1802–1806
UK MPs 1812–1818
Knights Grand Cross of the Order of the Bath
British Army personnel of the French Revolutionary Wars
British Army commanders of the Napoleonic Wars
British Army personnel of the Peninsular War
Members of the Privy Council of the United Kingdom
Governors and Governors-General of Malta
General Officers Commanding, Ceylon
British people of the Greek War of Independence